The Chimes (later Lenny Cocco & the Chimes) were an American doo wop group from Brooklyn.

The group came together under the direction of lead singer Lenny Cocco in the mid-1950s. Their first single was a version of "Once in a While"—a 1937 hit for Tommy Dorsey—released on Tag Records. The song became a hit in the U.S., peaking at No. 11 on the Billboard Hot 100 in January 1961, and No. 15 in Canada. The follow-up single was "I'm in the Mood for Love", a song from the 1930s. This hit No. 38 later that year. In 1962, they began recording as Lenny & the Chimes, and moved to Metro Records and then to Laurie Records in 1963. In 1964, they released the single "Two Times" on Vee-Jay, but broke up shortly after.

In subsequent decades they have re-formed for the doo-wop revival circuit, usually under the name Lenny Cocco and the Chimes. Cocco died in 2015 at age 78.

Members

Original
Lenny Cocco - lead singer and founder (born Leonard Cocco in Brooklyn in 1936; died on May 8, 2015, in Holbrook)
Pat DePrisco - first tenor
Richard Mercado - second tenor; died October 12, 2015
Joseph Croce - baritone; died 1993 approx
Pat McGuire - bass; died 1963, car accident

References
[ The Chimes] at AllMusic
Joel Whitburn, The Billboard Book of Top 40 Hits. 7th edn, 2000

Footnotes

External links
Cocco and the Chimes Website

Musical groups from Brooklyn
Doo-wop groups
Flair Records artists